Novy Sad is a rural locality (a khutor) in Enemskoye Urban Settlement of Takhtamukaysky District, the Republic of Adygea, Russia. The population was 1337 as of 2018. There are 13 streets.

Geography 
The khutor is located near Enem, 14 km west of Takhtamukay (the district's administrative centre) by road. Enem is the nearest rural locality.

References 

Rural localities in Takhtamukaysky District